The Mayer Cantata, WAB 60, is a cantata composed by Anton Bruckner in 1855. It is the second of three larger-scale occasional compositions, and the composer's first extended composition for large wind ensemble and choir.

History 
Bruckner composed the cantata for the name-day of Friedrich Mayer, the prior of the St. Florian Abbey. The piece was performed on 17 July 1855 on the evening before Mayer's name day.

The Mayer Cantata, composed one year after the Missa solemnis, was the penultimate large work composed by Bruckner during his stay in St. Florian. Five months later, three weeks before he moved to Linz, he composed the cantata , WAB 15, "Farewell to St. Florian".

The manuscript is stored in the archive of the St. Florian Abbey. An excerpt of the cantata was first published in band II/2, pp. 230–239 of the Göllerich/Auer biography.

Text 
The work is using a text by Franz Ernst Marinelli.

Setting 
The in total 169-bar long work in D major is scored for  choir,  choir and  vocal quartet, and wind instruments (2 oboes, 2 bassoons, 3 horns, 2 trumpets and 3 trombones).

The cantata is in three movements:
 Auf, Brüder! auf: men's choir and vocal quartet, horns and trombones (bars 1 to 27)
 Wohl ist's die Liebe: the vocal quartet a cappella (bars 28 to 69) - Langsam, gemütlich
 Heil unserm Vater: mixed choir, wind instruments (bars 70 to 169) - Heiter

The cantata, the second of three larger-scale occasional compositions, is Bruckner's first extended composition for large wind ensemble and choir. The first verse, which expresses a male point of view, introduced by a solo horn, is set for men's voices with instruments in a comparable register (horns and trombones). The text of the second movement, which projects a gentle, thoughtful mood, is sung with smaller forces a cappella. The words of the final stanza, which are highly celebratory, introduced by the trumpets, is using the whole tessitura of voices with a large set of wind instruments. The solo horn recalls the introductory motive, providing a musical unity. This cantata may be the first work, in which Bruckner's personal style is clearly recognisable.

Discography 

There is a single recording of the Mayer Cantate:
 Thomas Kerbl, Chorvereinigung, Weltliche Männerchöre – CD: LIVA 054, 2012 – in part 2 with organ colla parte, and in part 3 a 27-bar cut (bars 110-136)

References

Sources 
 August Göllerich, Anton Bruckner. Ein Lebens- und Schaffens-Bild,  – posthumous edited by Max Auer by G. Bosse, Regensburg, 1932
 Anton Bruckner – Sämtliche Werke, Band XXII/1: Kantaten und Chorwerke I (1845–1855), Musikwissenschaftlicher Verlag der Internationalen Bruckner-Gesellschaft, Franz Burkhart, Rudolf H. Führer and Leopold Nowak (Editor), Vienna, 1987 (Available on IMSLP: Neue Gesamtausgabe, XXII/1. Kantaten und Chorwerke Teil 1: Nr. 1-5)
 Uwe Harten, Anton Bruckner. Ein Handbuch. , Salzburg, 1996. 
 Keith William Kinder, The Wind and Wind-Chorus Music of Anton Bruckner, Greenwood Press, Westport, Connecticut, 2000
 Cornelis van Zwol, Anton Bruckner 1824–1896 – Leven en werken, uitg. Thoth, Bussum, Netherlands, 2012. 
 Crawford Howie, Anton Bruckner - A documentary biography, online revised edition

External links 
 
 Auf, Brüder! auf, und die Saiten zur Hand! D-Dur,WAB 60 Critical discography by Hans Roelofs 

Cantatas by Anton Bruckner
1855 compositions
Compositions in D major